Marwane Saâdane (born 17 January 1992) is a Moroccan professional football player who plays for Saudi Professional League club Al-Fateh.

Honours 
FUS de Rabat
Winner
 Coupe du Trône: 2014

References 

 

1992 births
Living people
Association football midfielders
Moroccan footballers
Moroccan expatriate footballers
Morocco international footballers
SCC Mohammédia players
Fath Union Sport players
Çaykur Rizespor footballers
Al-Fateh SC players
Süper Lig players
Saudi Professional League players
Expatriate footballers in Turkey
Moroccan expatriate sportspeople in Turkey
Expatriate footballers in Saudi Arabia
Moroccan expatriate sportspeople in Saudi Arabia
2016 African Nations Championship players
Morocco A' international footballers